Joseph Tchako (born 30 March 1993) is a New Caledonian footballer who plays as a defender for AS Tiga Sports.

References

1993 births
Living people
New Caledonian footballers
AS Mont-Dore players
2016 OFC Nations Cup players
Association football defenders
New Caledonia international footballers